Ostrowska Kolonia  is a village in the administrative district of Gmina Gizałki, within Pleszew County, Greater Poland Voivodeship, in west-central Poland.

The village has a population of 140.

References

Ostrowska Kolonia